Anderson is the name of some places in the U.S. state of Wisconsin:
Anderson, Burnett County, Wisconsin, a town
Anderson, Iron County, Wisconsin, a town
Anderson, Rock County, Wisconsin, an unincorporated community

es:Anderson (Wisconsin)